Mässa is a village in Saaremaa Parish, Saare County in western Estonia. As of 2011, the population was 11.

References

Villages in Saare County